Josef Finger (1 January 1841 – 6 May 1925) was an Austrian physicist and mathematician.

Biography 
Joseph Finger was born the son of a baker in Pilsen. He attended high school in Pilsen. He studied mathematics and physics at Charles University in Prague from 1859 to 1862. In 1865 and for financial reason he acquired the qualification to teach mathematics and physics at secondary schools and went into the teaching profession. On 17 March 1875 Finger received his doctorate at the University of Vienna, in 1876 he was qualified for the subject of analytical mechanics. 1897 Finger publishes "On the internal virial of an elastic body". Finger was from 1888 to 1890 the Dean of the Chemical School, and from 1890 to 1891 he was rector of the Technische Hochschule in Vienna. In 1916 Finger was awarded an honorary Doctorate of Technical Sciences. Finger is considered a pioneer of continuum mechanics.

References 
 H. Bednarczyk in Österreichische Ingenieur- und Architekten-Zeitschrift (ÖIAZ): "Josef Finger und Gustav Jaumann zwei Pioniere der heutigen Kontinuumsmechanik" 135 Heft10/1990 S. 538–545

External links
 

1841 births
1925 deaths
19th-century Austrian mathematicians
Austro-Hungarian mathematicians
Charles University alumni